Kedahda River is a river located in the province of British Columbia, Canada. The area around Kedahda River consists mainly of pine forests, and is virtually uninhabited, with less than two inhabitants per square kilometre. The annual average temperature is -3 °C. The warmest month is July, when the average temperature is 11 °C, and the coldest is January, when the average temperature is -17 °C.

References

Rivers of British Columbia
Cassiar Land District